This is a list of food days by country. Many countries have designated specific days as celebrations, commemorations, or acknowledgments of certain types of food and drink.

Global or international

Africa

Australia

Brazil

Canada

France

Georgia

Germany

Iceland

India

Italy

Japan

Korea

Luxembourg

Netherlands

New Zealand

Sweden

Turkmenistan

United Kingdom

United States
The United States has over 175 days related to awareness of specific foods or drinks.

January

February

March

April

May

June

July

August

September

October

November

December

See also
 
 List of awareness days
 Chase's Calendar of Events
 Hallmark holiday
 International observance
 List of commemorative days
 List of foods named after people
 Lists of holidays
 List of unofficial observances by date
 Traditional food
 List of vegetarian festivals

Notes

References
 
 
 
 
 
 
 "14 National Food Holidays That Offer Free Meals and Treats". U.S. News & World Report.
 
 
  
 

Lists of days
Lists of observances
Unofficial observances
Days

November observances